Beaucarnea is a genus of flowering plants native to Mexico and Central America. In the APG III classification system, it is placed in the family Asparagaceae, subfamily Nolinoideae (formerly the family Ruscaceae). Beaucarnea is sometimes treated as a synonym of the genus Nolina, with the species being then transferred to that genus. However, recent research shows that Beaucarnea should be treated as an independent genus.

The species are small tropical xerophytic trees growing to 6–10 m tall, with a trunk 20–40 cm diameter with a flared base; young plants are single-stemmed, branching only after flowering. The leaves are evergreen, linear, strap-shaped, 0.5-1.8 m long and 1.5–2 cm broad, leathery in texture, with a finely serrated margin. The flowers are produced only on old trees, forming on large panicles 75–110 cm long, the individual flowers numerous but very small (1.5 mm diameter), greenish-white, with six tepals.

Species
Plants of the World Online accepts the following species:

References

The Beaucarnea-Calibanus Page of the National University of Mexico: photographs of the species in the wild
Germplasm Resources Information Network: Beaucarnea
New York Botanic Garden: Beaucarnea pliabilis

Asparagaceae genera